Donal O'Neill is a Gaelic footballer for the Galway senior team and also plays club football for his local Cortoon Shamrocks.

References

1988 births
Living people
Cortoon Shamrocks Gaelic footballers
Galway inter-county Gaelic footballers